San Domingo is a 1970 West German drama film directed by Hans-Jürgen Syberberg. It tells the story of a man who joins a rock music hippie commune. When the commune members learn that his family is wealthy, they tell his parents that he has been kidnapped and demand a ransom. The film is loosely based on the story Betrothal in St. Domingo by Heinrich von Kleist. The actors are primarily non-professionals. The film received the 1971 Deutscher Filmpreis for Best Cinematography and Best Music.

Cast
  as Michi
 Alice Ottawa as Alice
 Wolfgang Haas as Hasi
 Hans-Georg Behr as Schorschi, poet and drug dealer
  as Michi's mother
 Peter Moland as Michi's father

References

External links 
 

1970 films
1970s avant-garde and experimental films
German avant-garde and experimental films
West German films
1970s German-language films
Films based on works by Heinrich von Kleist
Films directed by Hans-Jürgen Syberberg
Films set in Munich
Films about interracial romance
1970s German films